Qutan (Mandarin: 瞿昙镇) is a town in Ledu District, Haidong, Qinghai, China. In 2010, Qutan had a total population of 18,601: 9,672 males and 8,929 females: 3,367 aged under 14, 13,829 aged between 15 and 65 and 1,405 aged over 65.

References 
 

Township-level divisions of Qinghai
Haidong
Towns in China